Amorfon is a Japanese experimental music record label, located in Tokyo. Founded in 2004 by Yoshio Machida. Amorfon releases experimental and avant-garde music from all genres - from Electronica to World music.

Amorfon Releases
amorfon001 - Fitz Ellarald : The very air seems replete with humming and buzzing melodies (CD, 2004)
amorfon002 - Yoshio Machida : Infinite Flowers (CD, 2004)
amorfon003 - Činč : Shine of Wot? (CD, 2004)
amorfon004 - V.A. : *Music for Baby! (CD, 2004)
amorfon005 - V.A. : Kindermusik: Improvised Music by Babies (CD, 2005)
amorfon006 - Yoshio Machida : Naada (CD, 2006)
amorfon007 - Horkeskart : Live in Solitude (CD, 2006)
amorfon008 - Činč : Polyphonic Poetry (CD, 2006)
amorfon009 - Walk With The Penguin : Steal A Spoon For You (CD, 2007)
amorfon010 - Gene Bowen : Bourgeois Magnetic (CD, 2007)
amorfon011 - Yoshio Machida : Van Cleef & Arpels Exhibition Soundtracks  (CD, 2010)
amorfon012 - Talgung : Anura (CD, 2011)
amorfon013 - V.A. : Baby Rap: Voice Performance by Babies (CD, 2013)
amorfon014 - Jorge Queijo / Hiroki Chiba / Yoshio Machida : Luminant (CD, 2016)
amorfon015 - ŠIROM : I (CD, 2016)
amorfon016 - Yoshio Machida : Tender Blues (CD, 2016)
amorfon017 - Walk With The Penguin : Charm (CD, 2017)

Artists 
 Fitz Ellarald
 Yoshio Machida
 Činč
 Horkeskart
 Walk With The Penguin
 Gene Bowen
 Casiotone for the Painfully Alone
 DAT Politics
 minamo
 BusRatch
 Alejandra & Aeron
 Ryoichi Kurokawa
 Toshya Tsunoda
 Marko Ciciliani
 Andres F. Krause
 Benjamin Deutsch
 Myona Sonobe
 Maya Konishi
 Alyssa Elliott
 Erophey Dobrovolski
 Kristina Postic
 Goh Yokota
 Hinata Miyazaki
 Aoi Sato

See also 
 List of record labels

External links
 Official site

Japanese independent record labels
Record labels established in 2004
Alternative rock record labels
Experimental music record labels
Electronic music record labels
World music record labels